KHLU-CD, virtual and UHF digital channel 46, was a low-powered, Class A Univision-affiliated television station licensed to Honolulu, Hawaii, United States. The station was owned by Hawaiian TV Network, Ltd. On cable, the station was carried on Time Warner Cable digital channel 35, which added the station in March 2014.

History
KHLU signed on the air on August 26, 1994 as K60FJ and began airing Univision programming to Honolulu's growing Hispanic population.

Originally KHLU operated on channel 60, but when the FCC made that channel a full-powered allocation with more than seven companies applying for the last vacant TV signal in the market, they relocated to channel 46 and were upgraded to Class A status.

In 2010, KHLU filed an application with the FCC to convert its status from analog to digital. It was licensed for digital operation on channel 46 on May 29, 2015. On April 13, 2017, the FCC announced that KHLU-CD would relocate to RF channel 36 by April 12, 2019 as a result of the broadcast incentive auction.

KHLU-CD went dark on November 21, 2016 after its automated traffic system failed, which made it impossible to manage the station's programming and feed it to the transmitter. On November 17, 2017, KHLU-CD surrendered its license. While the shutdown of KHLU-CD left Honolulu as one of the few markets without an over-the-air Univision or UniMás affiliate, both networks maintain national feeds available locally on cable television.

References

Defunct television stations in the United States
HLU-CD
Television channels and stations established in 1996
Spanish-language television stations in the United States
1996 establishments in Hawaii
Low-power television stations in the United States
Television channels and stations disestablished in 2017
2017 disestablishments in Hawaii
HLU-CD